Haunted House Ice Cream was an ice cream produced in the UK by a company called Lyons Maid. It first went on sale in July 1973 and cost 4p.

The ice cream itself was white, and a picture was printed on it in edible ink. There were eight pictures in total: Frankenstein's Monster, a spook, a skeleton, a spider and web, some bats, a wicked witch and a creature. The pictures were shown in one of the following colors: pink, orange, red, green and blue. It was impossible to determine which picture was on the ice cream until the wrapper was opened. It was also impossible to determine which picture was on the ice cream after the wrapper was opened as the picture had inevitably smeared in transit or on opening.

See also
 List of frozen dessert brands

External links
 

Brand name frozen desserts